Lake Lapeyrère is a municipal unorganized territory, part of Portneuf in Quebec, (Canada). The RCM is included in the administrative region of the Capitale-Nationale. This area of the north shore of St. Lawrence river and the west bank of the Batiscan River is located about 75 kilometers northeast of Shawinigan, Quebec. The unorganized territory Lac-Lapeyrère includes Lapeyrère Township, which was established in 1907. The canton is one sector of Portneuf Wildlife Reserve and Zec Tawachiche. Territory Lac-Lapeyrère has several major water bodies including lakes Garneau, Travers, Robinson, Casgrain, Tage and Lapeyrère, and is drained to the east by the Batiscan River.

Lac-Lapeyrère unorganized territory was legally constituted on January 1, 1986 and has . According to the Canadian census of 2011, no resident was living permanently on the territory.

Toponymy 

Three homonyms using "Lapeyrère" exist: "Lac-Lapeyrère" (unorganized territory), the lake "Lapeyrère" and the Township Lapeyrère. Located in the north of the township of Lapeyrère, the lake is the largest in this unorganized territory.

The designation of these three homonyms refers to a passage in Quebec in 1906 of the warship "Tage" commissioned by Augustin Boué Lapeyrère (1852-1924), who became vice-admiral in 1908 and French Minister of Marine 1909 to 1911. Mr. Lapeyrère became commander in chief ally in the Mediterranean in 1914 and organized the blockade of the Austro-Hungarian fleet in the Adriatic.

The name "Lake Lapeyrère" (unorganized territory) was formalized on March 13, 1986, in the register of the names of places in the Commission de toponymie du Québec (Geographical Names Board of Québec).

See also 
 Batiscanie, Quebec
 Batiscan River
 Rivière-à-Pierre, Quebec
 Serpentine River (Québec)
 La Tuque, Quebec
 Portneuf Regional County Municipality
 Linton, Quebec (unincorporated territory)
 Lac-Masketsi, Quebec (unincorporated territory)

Sources 
Répertoire des municipalités du Québec
Commission de toponymie du Québec
Affaires municipales et régions - cartes régionales

References

Unorganized territories in Capitale-Nationale